Peter George Paterson (27 July 1916 – 8 June 1968) was an Australian rules footballer who played with Essendon in the Victorian Football League (VFL).

Family
The son of George Bell Paterson (1877–), and Helen Jane Crichton Paterson (1879–1966), née Berry, Peter George Paterson was born at Boort, Victoria on 27 July 1916.

He married Phyllis Ruth Patrick (1921–1981) on 12 December 1942.

Football

Essendon (VFL)
Paterson was recruited from Rochester via Barham and played with Essendon in 1938, 1939 and 1945.

Coburg (VFA)
He transferred from Essendon to Coburg without a clearance from Essendon, and was granted a permit to play by the VFA on 1 August 1945.

Death
He died at Hastings, Victoria on 8 June 1968.

Notes

References
 
 Maplestone, M., Flying Higher: History of the Essendon Football Club 1872–1996, Essendon Football Club, (Melbourne), 1996.  -- note that Maplestone (pp.405, 479, 480, and 486) has him as Patterson, with double "t".

External links 
 		
 
 Peter Paterson at The VFA Project.

1916 births
1968 deaths
Australian rules footballers from Victoria (Australia)
Essendon Football Club players